Bellaguarda is a village in the province of Lleida and autonomous community of Catalonia, Spain. It is the nominal source of the dry River Cana.

References

External links
 Government data pages 

Municipalities in Garrigues (comarca)
Populated places in Garrigues (comarca)